Karaçë or Karače (Serbian Cyrillic) is a village in Kosovo located in the municipality of Vushtrri and in the district of Mitrovicë. According to the Kosovar census of 2011, it has 192 inhabitants, all of whom are Albanians.

Geography

History

Demographics

Notable people
 Rahim Ademi, Croatian army general

See also 
 List of populated places in Kosovo

Notes and References

Notes

References

External links

Villages in Vushtrri